The 2020–2024 legislature of the Romanian Parliament is the current legislature of the Parliament of Romania, elected on 6 December 2020. In the said election, no party won an outright majority, but the Social Democratic Party (PSD) remained the largest political force in the parliament, in opposition however. The National Liberal Party (PNL), the Save Romania Union (USR), and the Democratic Alliance of Hungarians in Romania (UDMR/RMDSZ) formed a coalition government. The USR ran within a political alliance it established with a smaller party, more specifically the Freedom, Unity and Solidarity Party (PLUS), which was eventually absorbed by the former. The Alliance for the Union of Romanians (AUR) entered parliament starting this legislature with an unexpected high score, gaining more popularity ever since.

The PNL-USR-PLUS-UDMR/RMDSZ coalition was dissolved in early September 2021 following dispute over the so-called Anghel Saligny program and subsequent ousting of Justice Minister Stelian Ion (USR) by Prime Minister Florin Cîțu (PNL). This led to a months-long political crisis until the National Coalition for Romania (consisting of PSD, PNL, and UDMR/RMDSZ) was formed in late November 2021, forming the incumbent Ciucă Cabinet. The crisis also led to a PNL splinter, more specifically the Force of the Right (FD).

Chamber of Deputies
The President of the Chamber of Deputies for this legislature was initially Ludovic Orban (PNL) from December 2020 until his resignation in October 2021. Since 23 November 2021, the office had been held by Marcel Ciolacu (PSD).

Between Orban's and Ciolacu's terms, there were two acting Chamber presidents: Florin Roman and Sorin Grindeanu.

|- 
! style="text-align:center;" colspan=2 rowspan=2 | Party
! style="text-align:center;" colspan=2 | Election seating
! style="text-align:center;" rowspan=2 | Lost
! style="text-align:center;" rowspan=2 | Won
! style="text-align:center;" colspan=2 | Present seating
|-
! style="text-align:center;" | Seats
! style="text-align:center;" | %
! style="text-align:center;" | Seats
! style="text-align:center;" | %
|-
|  
| style="text-align:left;" | Social Democratic Party
| style="text-align:right;vertical-align:top;" | 110
| style="text-align:right;vertical-align:top;" | 33.33%
| style="text-align:right;vertical-align:top;" | 6
| style="text-align:right;vertical-align:top;" | 1
| style="text-align:right;vertical-align:top;" | 105
| style="text-align:right;vertical-align:top;" | 31.81%
|-
|  
| style="text-align:left;" | National Liberal Party
| style="text-align:right;vertical-align:top;" | 93
| style="text-align:right;vertical-align:top;" | 28.18%
| style="text-align:right;vertical-align:top;" | 16
| style="text-align:right;vertical-align:top;" | 2
| style="text-align:right;vertical-align:top;" | 79
| style="text-align:right;vertical-align:top;" | 23.93%
|-
| ! style="background-color: #00AAE7" | 
| style="text-align:left;" | Save Romania Union
| style="text-align:right;vertical-align:top;" | 55
| style="text-align:right;vertical-align:top;" | 16.66%
| style="text-align:right;vertical-align:top;" | 0
| style="text-align:right;vertical-align:top;" | 0
| style="text-align:right;vertical-align:top;" | 55
| style="text-align:right;vertical-align:top;" | 16.66%
|- 
| ! style="background-color: " | 
| style="text-align:left;" | Alliance for the Union of Romanians
| style="text-align:right;vertical-align:top;" | 33
| style="text-align:right;vertical-align:top;" | 10%
| style="text-align:right;vertical-align:top;" | 5
| style="text-align:right;vertical-align:top;" | 1
| style="text-align:right;vertical-align:top;" | 29
| style="text-align:right;vertical-align:top;" | 8.78%
|-
|  
| style="text-align:left;" | Democratic Alliance of Hungarians in Romania
| style="text-align:right;vertical-align:top;" | 21
| style="text-align:right;vertical-align:top;" | 6.36%
| style="text-align:right;vertical-align:top;" | 1
| style="text-align:right;vertical-align:top;" | 0
| style="text-align:right;vertical-align:top;" | 20
| style="text-align:right;vertical-align:top;" | 6.06%
|-
| ! style="background-color: #000000" | 
| style="text-align:left;" | Parties of ethnic minorities
| style="text-align:right;vertical-align:top;" | 18
| style="text-align:right;vertical-align:top;" | 5.45%
| style="text-align:right;vertical-align:top;" | 0
| style="text-align:right;vertical-align:top;" | 0
| style="text-align:right;vertical-align:top;" | 18
| style="text-align:right;vertical-align:top;" | 5.45%
|-
|  
| style="text-align:left;" | Force of the Right
| style="text-align:right;vertical-align:top;" | —
| style="text-align:right;vertical-align:top;" | —
| style="text-align:right;vertical-align:top;" | 1
| style="text-align:right;vertical-align:top;" | 14
| style="text-align:right;vertical-align:top;" | 13
| style="text-align:right;vertical-align:top;" | 3.93%
|-
| ! style="background-color: #0066B6" | 
| style="text-align:left;" | Social Liberal Humanist Party
| style="text-align:right;vertical-align:top;" | —
| style="text-align:right;vertical-align:top;" | —
| style="text-align:right;vertical-align:top;" | 0
| style="text-align:right;vertical-align:top;" | 4
| style="text-align:right;vertical-align:top;" | 4
| style="text-align:right;vertical-align:top;" | 1.21%
|-
|  
| style="text-align:left;" | Independents
| style="text-align:right;vertical-align:top;" | —
| style="text-align:right;vertical-align:top;" | —
| style="text-align:right;vertical-align:top;" | 0
| style="text-align:right;vertical-align:top;" | 3
| style="text-align:right;vertical-align:top;" | 3
| style="text-align:right;vertical-align:top;" | 0.90%
|- 
| ! style="background-color: " | 
| style="text-align:left;" | Romanian Nationhood Party
| style="text-align:right;vertical-align:top;" | —
| style="text-align:right;vertical-align:top;" | —
| style="text-align:right;vertical-align:top;" | 0
| style="text-align:right;vertical-align:top;" | 1
| style="text-align:right;vertical-align:top;" | 1
| style="text-align:right;vertical-align:top;" | 0.73%
|-
| ! style="background-color: " | 
| style="text-align:left;" | Alliance for the Homeland
| style="text-align:right;vertical-align:top;" | —
| style="text-align:right;vertical-align:top;" | —
| style="text-align:right;vertical-align:top;" | 0
| style="text-align:right;vertical-align:top;" | 1
| style="text-align:right;vertical-align:top;" | 1
| style="text-align:right;vertical-align:top;" | 0.73%
|-
! align=left colspan=2|Total
! 330
! 100
! colspan=2 | —
! 330
! 100
|}

Notes:

1 FD did not exist at the time of the 2020 legislative elections. All deputies were elected on PNL's list.

2 All deputies of PUSL were elected on PSD's list.

3 The PNR deputy was elected on AUR's list.

Senate
The President of the Senate for this legislature was initially Anca Dragu (USR), from December 2020 until her removal from office on 23 November 2021, being shortly afterwards replaced by Florin Cîțu (PNL).

|- 
! style="text-align:center;" colspan=2 rowspan=2 | Party
! style="text-align:center;" colspan=2 | Election seating
! style="text-align:center;" rowspan=2 | Lost
! style="text-align:center;" rowspan=2 | Won
! style="text-align:center;" colspan=2 | Present seating
|-
! style="text-align:center;" | Seats
! style="text-align:center;" | %
! style="text-align:center;" | Seats
! style="text-align:center;" | %
|-
|  
| style="text-align:left;" | Social Democratic Party
| style="text-align:right;vertical-align:top;" | 47
| style="text-align:right;vertical-align:top;" | 34.55%
| style="text-align:right;vertical-align:top;" | 1
| style="text-align:right;vertical-align:top;" | 0
| style="text-align:right;vertical-align:top;" | 46
| style="text-align:right;vertical-align:top;" | 33.82%
|-
|  
| style="text-align:left;" | National Liberal Party
| style="text-align:right;vertical-align:top;" | 41
| style="text-align:right;vertical-align:top;" | 30.14%
| style="text-align:right;vertical-align:top;" | 3
| style="text-align:right;vertical-align:top;" | 0
| style="text-align:right;vertical-align:top;" | 38
| style="text-align:right;vertical-align:top;" | 27.94%
|-
| ! style="background-color: #00AAE7" | 
| style="text-align:left;" | Save Romania Union
| style="text-align:right;vertical-align:top;" | 25
| style="text-align:right;vertical-align:top;" | 18.38%
| style="text-align:right;vertical-align:top;" | 0
| style="text-align:right;vertical-align:top;" | 0
| style="text-align:right;vertical-align:top;" | 25
| style="text-align:right;vertical-align:top;" | 18.38%
|- 
| ! style="background-color: " | 
| style="text-align:left;" | Alliance for the Union of Romanians
| style="text-align:right;vertical-align:top;" | 14
| style="text-align:right;vertical-align:top;" | 10.29%
| style="text-align:right;vertical-align:top;" | 1
| style="text-align:right;vertical-align:top;" | 0
| style="text-align:right;vertical-align:top;" | 13
| style="text-align:right;vertical-align:top;" | 9.56%
|-
|  
| style="text-align:left;" | Democratic Alliance of Hungarians in Romania
| style="text-align:right;vertical-align:top;" | 9
| style="text-align:right;vertical-align:top;" | 6.61%
| style="text-align:right;vertical-align:top;" | 0
| style="text-align:right;vertical-align:top;" | 0
| style="text-align:right;vertical-align:top;" | 9
| style="text-align:right;vertical-align:top;" | 6.61%
|-
|  
| style="text-align:left;" | Force of the Right1
| style="text-align:right;vertical-align:top;" | —
| style="text-align:right;vertical-align:top;" | —
| style="text-align:right;vertical-align:top;" | 0
| style="text-align:right;vertical-align:top;" | 3
| style="text-align:right;vertical-align:top;" | 3
| style="text-align:right;vertical-align:top;" | 2.20%
|-
| ! style="background-color: #0066B6" | 
| style="text-align:left;" | Social Liberal Humanist Party2
| style="text-align:right;vertical-align:top;" | —
| style="text-align:right;vertical-align:top;" | —
| style="text-align:right;vertical-align:top;" | 0
| style="text-align:right;vertical-align:top;" | 1
| style="text-align:right;vertical-align:top;" | 1
| style="text-align:right;vertical-align:top;" | 0.73%
|- 
| ! style="background-color: " | 
| style="text-align:left;" | Romanian Nationhood Party3
| style="text-align:right;vertical-align:top;" | —
| style="text-align:right;vertical-align:top;" | —
| style="text-align:right;vertical-align:top;" | 0
| style="text-align:right;vertical-align:top;" | 1
| style="text-align:right;vertical-align:top;" | 1
| style="text-align:right;vertical-align:top;" | 0.73%
|-
! align=left colspan=2|Total
! 136
! 100
! colspan=2 | —
! 136
! 100
|}

Notes:

1 FD did not exist at the time of the 2020 legislative elections. All senators were elected on PNL's list.

2 The PUSL senator was elected on PSD's list.

3 The PNR senator was elected on AUR's list.

See also
Parliament of Romania
Politics of Romania
List of members of the Chamber of Deputies of Romania (2020–2024)

References

Legislatures of the Romanian Parliament
2020 in Romania
2021 in Romania
2022 in Romania